Look Up may refer to:

 "Look Up" (song), a song by Daley
 Look Up (Bob Neuwirth album), 1996
 Look Up (Mod Sun album), 2015

See also 

 Don't Look Up
 Up (disambiguation)